Daniel Mukete (born 23 October 1997) is a Belarusian judoka.

He is the bronze medallist of the 2018 Judo Grand Slam Ekaterinburg in the -100 kg category.

References

External links
 

1997 births
Living people
Belarusian male judoka
20th-century Belarusian people
21st-century Belarusian people